Swiftsure was built in 1811 in France as Inconstant. In 1813 British owners purchased her and renamed her. An American privateer captured her in 1814 but she was quickly recaptured. Swiftsure was wrecked off the coast of Queensland in 1831.

Note: This is not the Inconstant that carried Napoleon from exile on Elba to the Hundred Days. That was another brig Inconstant, of roughly the same size as Swiftsure, and also launched in 1811. However, the vessel that transported Napoleon belonged to the French Navy, and was broken up at Brest in 1843.

History
Swiftsure was built in 1811  for a French owner as the single-decked brig-rigged Inconstant. 

Swiftsure first entered Lloyd's Register in 1813 with J.Banner, master, Crawford, owner, and trade Greenock–Newfoundland.

On 4 August 1814, Swiftsure, Lester, master, arrived at Newfoundland from Glasgow. Lloyd's List (LL) reported on 21 October 1814 that Swiftsure, Lester, master, was one of four merchantmen that American privateers had captured. Their crews were landed at Viana.) 

Swiftsures captor was the American privateer schooner . Swiftsure was in the company of the schooner James off the Azores. The British vessels engaged Saratoga, which nevertheless prevailed. 

Lloyd's List reported on 13 December that Swiftsure, Lester, master, from Newfoundland to Oporto, had been retaken and sent into Bermuda.

By 1828 Swiftsure was sailing between the United Kingdom, New South Wales, and Van Diemen's Land.

Loss
On 4 July 1829 Swiftsure was wrecked at Cape Sidmouth, New South Wales (modern Queensland). Resource rescued all aboard. Swiftsure was on a voyage from New South Wales to Mauritius. The survivors, and part of the cargo, arrived at Mauritius on 17 August.

The wreck of Swiftsure was discovered in November 2014. The discovery was officially announced in June 2015.

Citations

References
 

1811 ships
Ships built in France
Captured ships
Merchant ships of France
Sailing ships of France
Merchant ships of the United Kingdom
Sailing ships of the United Kingdom
Maritime incidents in 1829
Shipwrecks of the Torres Strait